Eastmont School District is a public school district located in Douglas County, Washington, United States.

Eastmont Schools 
Schools in Eastmont School District include:

 Eastmont High School - Grades 10 through 12
 Eastmont Jr. High - Grades 7,8,9
 Sterling Jr. High- Grades 7,8,9
 Clovis Point Elementary
 Kenroy Elementary - 
 Grant Elementary - 
 Rock Island Elementary - 
 Lee Elementary - 
 Cascade Elementary -

Eastmont High School 
Principal - Lance Noell
Asst. Principal (Grade 10: A-M) - Jon Abbott
Asst. Principal (Grade 10: N-Z) - Jim Schmutzler
Asst. Principal (Grade 11) - Tom McRae
Asst. Principal (Grade 12) - Stacia Hardie

Administration 
Eastmont School District officials include:

School Board as of January 2020:

 Annette Eggers
 Dave Piepel
 Whitney Smith
 Meaghan Vibbert
 Cindy Wright

Other officials as of March 2023:

 Becky Berg - Superintendent
 Spencer Taylor      - Executive Director Elementary Ed.
 Matt Charlton  - Assistant Superintendent Secondary Ed.

References

External links 
District Home Page

School districts in Washington (state)
Education in Douglas County, Washington